The Tiger Woods Story is a 1998 television film directed by LeVar Burton and starring Keith David and Khalil Kain. It was nominated for three Daytime Emmy Awards in 1999.

Cast
Keith David as Earl Woods
Khalil Kain as Tiger Woods (age 21)
Freda Foh Shen as Tida Woods
Gary LeRoi Gray as Tiger Woods (age 9-13)
John Cho as Jerry Chang
Skyler Pierce as Infant Tiger Woods
Ski Pierce as Infant Tiger Woods

References

External links

1998 television films
1998 films
Films directed by LeVar Burton
American biographical films
Golf films
Cultural depictions of Tiger Woods
1990s English-language films
1990s American films